Gabriel Ramos da Penha (born 20 March 1996) is a Brazilian professional footballer who plays as a winger for Riga FC.

Career

Riga 
On 7 July 2022 he scored against Derry City at the Ryan McBride Brandywell Stadium in Derry for the UEFA Europa Conference League in the first qualifying round of the season 2022–23.

References

External links 
 
 

1996 births
Living people
Footballers from Rio de Janeiro (city)
Brazilian footballers
Association football midfielders
Brazilian expatriate footballers
Expatriate footballers in Georgia (country)
Expatriate footballers in Belarus
Expatriate footballers in Latvia
Esporte Clube Bahia players
Cuiabá Esporte Clube players
FC Dinamo Batumi players
FC Torpedo-BelAZ Zhodino players
Riga FC players
Londrina Esporte Clube players